Crobylanthe is a monotypic genus of flowering plants in the family Rubiaceae. The genus contains only one species, viz. Crobylanthe pellacalyx, which is endemic to Sarawak.

References

External links
Kew World Checklist of Selected Plant Families, Crobylanthe

Urophylleae
Endemic flora of Borneo
Flora of Sarawak
Monotypic Rubiaceae genera